A national plebscite and local plebscites were held on April 7, 1981 in the Philippines.  The plebiscite was set to amend the following revisions made by the Interim Batasang Pambansa, pursuant to Batasang Pambansa Blg. 122:

Call for the establishment of a modified parliamentary system, amending for this purpose Articles VII, VIII and IX of the Philippine Constitution
Institute electoral reforms
Provides that a natural-born citizen of the Philippines who has lost his Philippine citizenship may be a transferee of private land, for use by him as residence

Also were held in certain areas the creation of three municipalities in Bohol, South Cotabato and Zamboanga del Norte:
For the creation of the new municipality of Bien Unido, Bohol, from certain barangays of Alibon and Trinidad, Bohol
For the creation of the new municipality of Sto. Niño, South Cotabato from certain barangays of Banga and Norala, South Cotabato
For the creation of the new municipality of Baliguian, Zamboanga del Norte, from certain Barangays of Siocon, Zamboanga del Norte

Results
The majority of the Filipino people voted "Yes" to the terms and constitutional amendments.

On changing the form of government

On prohibiting elective officials from being appointed, limiting participation to two largest parties only, and prohibiting party-switching

On allowing erstwhile natural-born citizens who lost citizenship to own land

See also
Commission on Elections
Politics of the Philippines
Philippine elections
President of the Philippines

References 

1981 elections in the Philippines
1981 referendums
Constitutional referendums in the Philippines
Presidency of Ferdinand Marcos